Josiah Pierce (August 15, 1792 – June 25, 1866) was an American politician and lawyer in Maine. Pierce, who was born in Baldwin, Maine, attended Bowdoin College. After graduating in 1821, he settled in Gorham, Maine and became a practicing lawyer. Known for his public speaking skills, Pierce served as Judge of Probate for Cumberland County. He also published A History of the Town of Gorham, Maine in 1862  as well as The Centennial Anniversary of the Settlement of Gorham; Volume 1.

Politics
Beyond his law career, Pierce served as a town selectman for Gorham as well as serving three years in the Maine Senate. From 1835 to 1836, he was President of the Maine Senate as a Democrat. As Senate President, Pierce was paid $4 a day, double that of other senators.

References

1792 births
1866 deaths
Maine lawyers
People from Baldwin, Maine
People from Gorham, Maine
Bowdoin College alumni
Presidents of the Maine Senate
Democratic Party Maine state senators
Historians of Maine
19th-century American politicians
19th-century American lawyers